Odogwu is a surname. Notable people with the surname include:

Paolo Odogwu (born 1997), British rugby union player
Raphael Odogwu (born 1991), Italian footballer
Sunny Odogwu (1931–2018), Nigerian businessman
Violet Odogwu (born 1942), Nigerian track and field athlete

Surnames of African origin